The 1941–42 Segunda División season saw 24 teams participate in the second flight Spanish league. Betis and Zaragoza was promoted to Primera División. Real Unión, Levante and Cartagena were relegated to Divisiones Regionales de Fútbol.

Overview before the season
24 teams joined the league, including two relegated from the 1940–41 La Liga and 5 promoted from Divisiones Regionales.

Relegated from La Liga
Zaragoza
Murcia

Promoted from Divisiones Regionales'''

Alavés
Constancia
Ferroviaria
Ceuta
Elche

Group 1

Teams

League table

Results

Top goalscorers

Top goalkeepers

Group 2

Teams

League table

Results

Top goalscorers

Top goalkeepers

Group 3

Teams

League table

Top goalscorers

Top goalkeepers

Promotion playoffs

First round

League table

Second round

Relegation playoffs

Group 1

League table

Group 2

League table

Group 3

League table

Group 4

League table

Group 5

League table

Group 6

League table

External links
LFP website

Segunda División seasons
2
Spain